Candy Ann Thomson (born March 8, 1967 in North Vancouver, British Columbia) is a former field hockey player from Canada, who earned a total number of thirty international caps for the Women's Senior National Team during her career in the early 1990s. She played club hockey on national level for Vancouver Doves. Thomson was a member of the Canadian team at the 1992 Summer Olympics in Barcelona, Spain.

International Senior Tournaments
 1991 – Pan American Games, Havana, Cuba (2nd)
 1992 – Summer Olympics, Barcelona, Spain (7th)
 1997 – World Cup Qualifier, Harare, Zimbabwe (11th)

References

External links
 
 
 

1967 births
Living people
Canadian female field hockey players
Olympic field hockey players of Canada
Field hockey players at the 1992 Summer Olympics
Pan American Games medalists in field hockey
Pan American Games silver medalists for Canada
Field hockey players at the 1991 Pan American Games
Field hockey people from British Columbia
Sportspeople from North Vancouver
Medalists at the 1991 Pan American Games